Paramaatma is a 1994 Indian Hindi-language drama film directed by Bapu, starring Mithun Chakraborty (in dual role), Juhi Chawla, Amrish Puri and Anjana Mumtaz. The film was released under the Banner of Shri Siddhi Vinayaka International. It is a remake of Bapu's 1969 Telugu film Buddhimantudu.

Plot 
The film is about an honest person who finds happiness in spiritual life and goes up against his atheist brother who rejects religion. Mithun Chakraborty plays a double role as both brothers.

Cast 

Mithun Chakraborty as Mahdavcharya / Gopal 'Chhotu'(brothers)
Juhi Chawla as Rajni
Amrish Puri as Chaudhry Rudranarayan
Harish Patel as Munshi
Anjana Mumtaz as Thakurain-Rajni's mom
Reema Lagoo as Mahdavcharya's wife
Sushmita Mukherjee as Meenakshi
Shammi as Rudranarayan's wife
Raja Bundela as Bhagwan Shri Kishan/Kanhaiya/Murli Manohar
Vikas Anand as District Education Officer

Songs 
The songs of this film, scored by Bappi Lahiri were successful.

 "Swarg Mein Milegi" – Kumar Sanu
 "Ta Ta Tata" – Sudesh Bhosle
 "Tune Mera Dil" – Kumar Sanu, Alka Yagnik
 "Jai Radhe Radhe" – Part I – S. P. Balasubrahmanyam
 "Margorita" – Bali Brahmbhatt
 "Tu Tu Turu" – Alka Yagnik
 "Bhagwan Ka Ye Mandir" – S. P. Balasubrahmanyam, Mohammed Aziz
 "Jai Radhe Radhe" – Part II – Kavita Krishnamurthy

References

External links 
 

1990s Hindi-language films
1994 films
Films directed by Bapu
Films scored by Bappi Lahiri
Films shot in Ooty
Hindi remakes of Telugu films
Mithun's Dream Factory films